Animal Rescue is a syndicated, E/I-compliant TV series hosted and produced by Alex Paen.  The series is about people trying to save animals from danger.  Animal control officers try to assist animals in unsafe environments and respond other animal related emergencies. It is an eight-time Daytime Emmy nominated show.

External links
 
 
 

American documentary television series
Television series about animals
Television series by Tribune Entertainment